Dyusmetovo (Düsmät) is a rural locality (a village) in Burayevsky Selsoviet, Burayevsky District, Bashkortostan, Russia. The population was 96 as of 2010. There are 3 streets.

Geography 
Dyusmetovo is located 6 km northeast of Burayevo (the district's administrative centre) by road. Burayevo is the nearest rural locality.

References 

Rural localities in Burayevsky District